During the 1999–2000 English football season, Ipswich Town competed in the Football League First Division.

Season summary
Ipswich finished the season in third place in the First Division, missing out on the two automatic places for promotion to the Premiership and instead took part in the play-offs for the fourth year running, to determine the third promoted team. Ipswich finished two points behind Manchester City (who were promoted in second place) and four behind league winners Charlton Athletic.

On the final day of the league season Ipswich played Walsall, and won 2–0 with two goals from Ipswich's top scorer David Johnson, who finished the season with 22 goals. At one point, after his first goal, second place Manchester City were trailing to Blackburn, meaning that Ipswich would qualify for promotion automatically. However, this only lasted nine minutes, with City eventually scoring four goals to win the match and secure promotion.

In the play-off semi-finals, Ipswich faced sixth-placed Bolton Wanderers, who had beaten them in the semi-final the previous year. After a 2–2 draw in the first leg away at the Reebok Stadium, Ipswich won 5–3 at Portman Road, winning 7–5 on aggregate.

In the play-off final, the last domestic competitive fixture at Wembley Stadium before the stadium was redeveloped, 
Ipswich played fourth-placed Barnsley, beating them 4–2 and finally securing their return to the Premiership after an absence of five years.

First-team squad

Left club during season

Reserve squad

Pre-season
Ipswich traveled to Scandinavia for pre-season prior to the 1999–2000 season, playing friendlies against Swedish sides Gefle IF and GIF Sundsvall.

Legend

Competitions

Football League First Division

League table

Legend

Ipswich Town's score comes first

Matches

First Division play-offs

FA Cup

League Cup

Transfers

Transfers in

Loans in

Transfers out

Loans out

Squad statistics
All statistics updated as of end of season

Appearances and goals

|-
! colspan=14 style=background:#dcdcdc; text-align:center| Goalkeepers

|-
! colspan=14 style=background:#dcdcdc; text-align:center| Defenders

|-
! colspan=14 style=background:#dcdcdc; text-align:center| Midfielders

|-
! colspan=14 style=background:#dcdcdc; text-align:center| Forwards

|-

Goalscorers

Clean sheets

Disciplinary record

Awards

Player awards

PFA First Division Team of the Year

References

External links
 Ipswich Town squad for 1999–2000 season

Ipswich Town F.C. seasons
Ipswich Town F.C.